Michele Paoletti (born 24 March 1974) is a sailor from Trieste, Italy. who represented his country at the 2000 Summer Olympics in Sydney, Australia as crew member in the Soling. With helmsman Nicola Celon and fellow crew member Daniele De Luca they took the 14th place.

References

Living people
1963 births
Sailors at the 2000 Summer Olympics – Soling
Olympic sailors of Italy
Sportspeople from Trieste
Italian male sailors (sport)